Monchique is a town and municipality in southern Portugal. It may also refer to:

 Caldas de Monchique, a spa town in the Serra de Monchique
 Monchique Islet, Azores
 Monchique (parish), in Monchique Municipality 
 Serra de Monchique, a chain of mountains in the western part of the Algarve region of Portugal